The tapping protocol is an initiative developed by the government of New York City to provide members of the deaf and hard of hearing community, as well as others who are unable to voice, with a means of directly reporting emergencies to 9-1-1 from the streets of New York City.

The tapping protocol can be employed when calling 9-1-1 from a pay phone or when using one of New York City's emergency call boxes to summon help. In both cases, the person reporting the emergency communicates with the 9-1-1 call-taker by tapping in a specific pattern with a finger, pen, key, etc., on the mouthpiece of the phone or the speaker section of the call box.

Two tapping patterns are used in order to distinguish the type of assistance requested: a steady tapping pattern indicates a request for Police assistance, while a repeated two-tap pattern indicates a request for Fire and Emergency Medical Service ("EMS") response. The person reporting the emergency should employ the appropriate tapping method for at least 90 seconds, and ideally until the requested emergency services arrive. If possible, the person should remain at the pay phone or call box location to direct arriving emergency personnel to the emergency.

History  
The tapping protocol was introduced in 1996 in order to meet a federal court's requirement that New York offer a 9-1-1 notification alternative that would "provide the hearing-impaired with a means of identifying not only their location, but also the type of emergency being reported." Under New York City's Enhanced 9-1-1 ("E-911") system, every telephone and emergency call box automatically transmits its location to 911 operators, so that an operator receiving a tapping call will have the caller's location on-screen and will be able to distinguish, by the tapping pattern, which emergency services are being requested.

The tapping protocol and E-911 system have been in place in New York City since then.

See also 
 Text-to-9-1-1

References

External links 
 NYC Mayor's Office for People with Disabilities ("MOPD") website
 Getting Emergency Assistance from Pay Phones / Emergency Call Boxes
 MOPD information sheet on how deaf and hard of hearing persons can access emergency services

Assistive technology
Healthcare in New York City
New York City Police Department
New York City Fire Department
Emergency telephone numbers
Emergency communication
Public phones